Favorite Blue was a Japanese pop band active from 1996 until 2000. Takashi Kimura became a record producer and composer of the m.o.v.e. Maya Matsuzaki left Avex and formed mamy drop.

Main Members
Takashi Kimura - Guitar, keyboard, composer, arranger

Maya Matsuzaki - Vocals, lyrics

Discography

Singles
 'Ai yorimo Hageshiku, Dare yorimo Itoshiku' (12 June 1996)
 'Active, my dream' (25 September 1996)
 'SHAKE ME UP!' (27 November 1996)
 'Movin'oN' (30 April 1997)
 'Change by me' (30 July 1997)
 'true gate' (21 August 1997)
 'Sayonara yori Eien no Naka de' (3 December 1997)
 'Missing Place' (21 January 1998)
 'close my love' (15 July 1998)
 'Let me go!' (5 November 1998)
 'truth of love' (2 December 1998)
 'PRIDE -close to you-' (31 March 1999)
 'solitude' (8 May 1999)
 'next days' (22 September 1999)
 'sometime, somewhere' (26 January 2000)

Albums
 DREAM & MEMORIES (5 February 1997)
 Missing place (18 February 1998)
 FB in the remix (12 August 1998)
 solitude (16 June 1999)
 FB BEST -eternal trax- (2 February 2000)

DVD
 FB BEST -eternal pictures- (2 February 2000)

Video
 FB visual trax (26 August 1998)
 FB vvisual trax II (2 February 2000)

External links
 Favorite Blue- The official website

Japanese pop music groups